The Portland Company Marine Complex is an  industrial site in Portland, Maine's East End neighborhood. The Portland Company was established in 1846 and built railroad equipment for the adjacent Portland terminus of the Atlantic and St. Lawrence Railroad connection between Portland and Montreal. It ceased production in 1978. In August 2013, the property was sold to a group of developers. At the time of its sale, the property had a tax-assessed value of $1.9 million. Since 1993, the building has been home to the Maine Narrow Gauge Railroad Museum as well as host to the annual events  Maine Boat Show and Maine Flower Show.

References

External links
 Portland Company official website
 The Portland Company Complex, ca. 1938 Maine Memory Network

Industrial buildings completed in 1846
Foundries in the United States
Industrial buildings and structures in Portland, Maine
1846 establishments in Maine